James Madison High School is a public high school in San Diego, California. It is part of the San Diego Unified School District.  Madison's  campus opened in 1962. Serving almost 1,100 students in grades 9–12, it is located in the Clairemont Mesa East neighborhood, north of Balboa Ave, south of Clairemont Mesa Blvd, and west of Interstate 805.

Sports 
The Warhawks were Central League Champions for football in 2005, 2007, and 2008. They went to the C.I.F. Finals in 2008 against defending champion Valley Center, led by head coach Rick Jackson. In 2010, Madison High School won their first C.I.F. title against Valley Center. Also has won the Western League Championship 2006-2015

Two years later, the football program won their second C.I.F. San Diego championship in 2012. The team was invited to and won the 2012 California Division 3 State Championship Bowl game. Finally winning the division 1 California State championship in December 2016, when they got second overall in the state of California. Cathedral Catholic High School, another school in Southern California, won the Elite division, or the Open division. They got first overall.

The baseball facility is named after longtime coach Bob Roeder. The baseball head coach is Robert Lovato.

The Warhawks football field also serves as the home field for the PDL  team San Diego Zest.

Campus use
In 2015 the Minato School, a weekend Japanese school, began using Madison High to hold classes.

Notable alumni
 Ian Clarkin (Class of 2013), professional baseball player (Chicago White Sox)
 Al Fitzmorris, Major League Baseball pitcher for the Kansas City Royals in the 1970s.
 Mike Martz (Class of 1969), former NFL head coach (St. Louis), former offensive coordinator (Chicago Bears), now TV sports analyst.
 Shawn Nelson, perpetrator of the 1995 San Diego tank rampage
 Chris Riley (Class of 1991), professional golfer, PGA Tour
 Robbie Rouse (Class of 2009), collegiate football player, all-time leading rusher for California State University Fresno.
 Lori Saldaña (Class of 1976), Democratic politician, former member of California State Assembly
 Nelson Simmons, Major League Baseball player in the 1980s.
 Scott Simpson (Class of 1973), professional golfer, winner of the 1987 U.S. Open
 Rich Tylski, NFL offensive lineman.
 David Westerfield, convicted murderer of Danielle van Dam (high-profile murder in San Diego, 2002).

References

Clairemont, San Diego
Public high schools in California
High schools in San Diego
1962 establishments in California